is a former Japanese football player.

Playing career
Saito was born in Fukuoka Prefecture on July 2, 1976. After graduating from Kokushikan University, he joined J2 League club Montedio Yamagata in 2000. On April 4, 2001, he debuted in J.League Cup (v Urawa Reds). However he could only play this match until 2001. In 2002, he moved to Regional Leagues club Sagawa Printing. The club was promoted to Japan Football League from 2003. Although he played many matches, his opportunity to play decreased from 2005 and he retired in end of 2006 season.

Club statistics

References

External links

1976 births
Living people
Kokushikan University alumni
Association football people from Fukuoka Prefecture
Japanese footballers
J2 League players
Japan Football League players
Montedio Yamagata players
SP Kyoto FC players
Association football goalkeepers